"Back to the 80s" is a song by Norwegian-Danish band Aqua. The song was written by members Søren Rasted, Claus Norreen, and produced by Rasted, for their second greatest hits album (2009). "Back to the 80s" was Aqua's first single in eight years, following the release of the 2001 single "We Belong to the Sea". "Back to the 80s" was released on 25 May 2009 as the lead single from Greatest Hits and topped the Danish Singles Chart for six weeks.

Background and composition
The song details a large number of celebrities and artifacts from the 1980s, such as Ronald Reagan, Miami Vice, M&M's, Michael Jackson, The Terminator (in the original Danish release of the song), the Commodore 64, Soap, Rocky, Cherry Coke, Mr. T, Twisted Sister, MTV, Iron Maiden, 7 Up, Bananarama, The Breakfast Club, Huey Lewis and the News, Top Gun, David Hasselhoff, The Cosby Show, the Rubik's Cube, Dynasty, Moon Boots, Devo, Barbie, Poltergeist and Ferris Bueller's Day Off.

Upon international release of the single, the group decided to change the line "When M&M was just a snack and Michael Jackson's skin was black" from the original Danish release to "When M&M was just a snack and Arnie told us I'll be back" (in reference to Arnold Schwarzenegger). They decided on this out of respect for Jackson, who died only a month after the single was released.

The song was released as a CD single in France on 9 November 2009. France is the only country receiving a CD release of "Back to the 80s", including the original song and two additional remixes.

Chart performance
"Back to the 80s" debuted on 5 June 2009 at number one on both the Danish Singles Chart and Airplay Chart. It claimed the mark for most weekly plays on Danish radio with 585. The single spent six weeks at No. 1 in Denmark and peaked at No. 3 in Norway and at No. 25 in Sweden.

Music video
In mid-May, it was announced that a video was being made. Due to a lengthy post-production process, the video didn't hit the internet until 10 June 2009. The video features the group in front of a variety of green screen created backgrounds, dressed in 1980s rocker fashions. The video is presented in "Aquascope", returning to the Aquarium-era tradition.

Track listings

Credits and personnel
 Lyrics: Søren Rasted, Claus Norreen
 Music: Søren Rasted
 Producer: Søren Rasted in Elektron Studio
 Engineer: Nicolaj Rasted
 Guitars: Peter Düring
 Drums: Thomas Troelsen, Søren Rasted
 Keyboards: Claus Norreen, Søren Rasted
 Lead vocals: Lene Nystrøm, René Dif
 Backing vocals: Søren Rasted
 Mixing: Lars Overgaard at Audio Mix
 Mastering: Jan Eliasson at Audio Planet

Charts and certifications

Weekly charts

Certifications

References

2009 singles
2009 songs
Aqua (band) songs
List songs
Number-one singles in Denmark
Songs about nostalgia
Songs written by Claus Norreen
Songs written by Søren Rasted
Universal Records singles